Ongniud Banner (Mongolian:   Oŋniɣud qosiɣu) is a banner of eastern Inner Mongolia, People's Republic of China. It is under the administration of Chifeng City,  to the south-southwest. Yulong Shahu Scenic Area is located about 25 km north of Ongniud town. The south of Ongniud Banner is arable land with grassy hills. The north east half is predominantly grassland and desert.

Climate

References

www.xzqh.org 

 
Banners of Inner Mongolia
Chifeng